The coat of arms of Abbotsford, British Columbia, was granted by the Canadian Heraldic Authority on 25 October 1995. The grant included the full coat of arms as well as a flag and a badge, both derived from the arms.

History
Incl previous versions

Symbolism
Crest
text
 
Shield
text
 
Compartment
text

Supporters
text

Motto
UNUS CUM VIRIBUS DUORUM ("One with the strength of two") was the motto of the District of Abbotsford, and was adopted as the new City's motto when the district merged with the District of Matsqui in 1995.

Other Elements
text

See also
Canadian heraldry
National symbols of Canada
List of Canadian provincial and territorial symbols
Heraldry

References

External links
Listing in the Public Register of Arms, Flags and Badges of Canada

Abbotsford
Abbotsford, British Columbia